Plattin Creek is a stream in northeastern St. Francois and Jefferson counties in the U.S. state of Missouri. It is a tributary of the Mississippi River.

It continues to the north passing the community of Plattin and passing under US Route 61 and I-55 at the south edge of Festus.

Plattin Creek most likely derives its name from nearby La Platte Mine.

See also
List of rivers of Missouri

References

Rivers of Jefferson County, Missouri
Rivers of St. Francois County, Missouri
Rivers of Missouri